Shoaf Historic District is a national historic district located at Georges Township, Fayette County, Pennsylvania.  The district includes 39 contributing buildings, 1 contributing site, and 5 contributing structures related to coke production in the community of Shoaf. The community was first established between 1903 and 1905 by the H. C. Frick & Company, and most of the contributing buildings were built between 1903 and the 1920s.  The workers' housing largely consists of semi-detached frame dwellings.  Mine and processing related buildings and structures include three original batteries of coke ovens (c. 1904), wood and steel tipple (c. 1905), mine entrance tipple (c. 1904), brick power house (1905), brick blacksmith and carpenter shop (1910), and concrete block supply house (c. 1919).  Other buildings include the St. Helen's Roman Catholic Church rectory and a multiple-car garage (1922).

It was added to the National Register of Historic Places in 1994.

References

External links
Shoaf Mine & Coke Works, East side of Shoaf, off Township Route 472, Shoaf, Fayette County, PA: 6 photos, 4 data pages, and 1 photo caption page at Historic American Buildings Survey
Shoaf coke works ruins and patch town

Historic American Buildings Survey in Pennsylvania
Historic districts on the National Register of Historic Places in Pennsylvania
Historic districts in Fayette County, Pennsylvania
National Register of Historic Places in Fayette County, Pennsylvania